A Decent Man is a 2015 Swiss-German drama film written and directed by Micha Lewinsky. It stars Devid Striesow, Maren Eggert and Lotte Becker. It premiered at the 2015 Zurich Film Festival and opened domestically in 2016.

Plot 
Thomas Engel is always anxious to avoid conflict. At any cost. This compulsive striving for harmony, however, proves to be his road to ruin. He will fight for a peaceful solution. Violently, if need be.

References

External links 
 

2015 films
2015 drama films
2010s German-language films
Swiss drama films
Swiss German-language films